John Taylor M.D. (d. 6 December 1821, Shiraz) was a Scottish missionary in Gujarat, then a government surgeon in Bombay. He translated Bhaskaracharya's Lilavati into English (Bombay, 1816). He died in 1821 at Shiraz, Persia where he had gone for the benefit of his health.

References

Translators from Sanskrit
1821 deaths
Protestant missionaries in India
Year of birth unknown
Alumni of the University of Edinburgh
Scottish Protestant missionaries
Missionary linguists